Eyes of the Underworld is a 1929 American crime film directed by Leigh Jason and Ray Taylor and written by Leigh Jason and Carl Krusada. The film stars Bill Cody, Sally Blane, Arthur Lubin, Harry Tenbrook, Charles Clary and Monte Montague. The film was released on April 28, 1929, by Universal Pictures.

Cast        
Bill Cody as Pat Doran
Sally Blane as Florence Hueston
Arthur Lubin as Gang Leader
Harry Tenbrook as Gimpy Johnson
Charles Clary as John Hueston
Monte Montague as Gardener

References

External links
 

1929 films
1920s English-language films
American crime films
1929 crime films
Universal Pictures films
Films directed by Leigh Jason
Films directed by Ray Taylor
American silent feature films
American black-and-white films
1920s American films